Vestre Toten is a municipality in Innlandet county, Norway. It is located in the traditional district of Toten. The administrative centre of the municipality is the village of Raufoss. Other villages in the municipality include Bøverbru, Eina, and Reinsvoll.

The  municipality is the 287th largest by area out of the 356 municipalities in Norway. Vestre Toten is the 89th most populous municipality in Norway with a population of 13,572.

General information
Vestre Toten was established as a municipality on 1 January 1838 (see formannskapsdistrikt law). On 1 January 1875, there was a border adjustment between Østre Toten Municipality and Vestre Toten Municipality. On 1 January 1908, the municipality was divided into three parts: Kolbu Municipality (population: 2,412) in the southeast, Eina Municipality (population: 1,173) in the southwest, and Vestre Toten Municipality (population: 4,027) in the north. During the 1960s, there were many municipal mergers across Norway due to the work of the Schei Committee. On 1 January 1964, the following areas were merged to form a new, larger Vestre Toten Municipality:
all of the old Vestre Toten Municipality (population: 9,113)
the Sørligrenda area of Vardal Municipality (population: 87)
all of the old Eina Municipality (population: 1,591)
the area on the south end of the lake Einavatnet from Gran Municipality (population: 12)

Name
The municipality is named after the district of Toten. The first word Vestre means "western", thus the meaning of the name Vestre Toten is "(the) western (part of) Toten". (The parish of Toten was divided in 1825 and in 1838, the parish became a civil municipality.) The name Toten has an unknown meaning, but it might mean "the pleasant district" or "something one likes".

Coat of arms
The coat of arms was granted on 3 May 1991. The official blazon is "In vert, two silver knives in bend sinister". This means the arms have a green field (background) and the charge is a knife (specifically a special local knife known as a Toten knife). The knife has a tincture of argent which means it is colored white most of the time, but if it is made out of metal, then silver is used. The green color in the field symbolizes the local forests and agriculture and the knife was chosen since the area has a long tradition of wood carving and knife making. The arms were designed by Inge Rotevatn.

Churches
The Church of Norway has three parishes within the municipality of Vestre Toten. It is part of the Toten prosti (deanery) in the Diocese of Hamar.

History

According to the sagas, Halfdan Hvitbeinn (Whiteleg) was the first Yngling in Norway. He conquered Romerike, part of Hedmark, part of Vestfold, and Toten. He was killed in Toten around the year 740.

In 1021, according to saga, King Olaf (reigned 1015–1028) converted Toten to Christianity. Also, King Håkon IV (reigned 1217–1263) came to Toten around the year 1226 to settle local unrest.

Christian II (1481–1559) was a Danish monarch and King of Denmark and Norway from 1513–1523 and also the King of Sweden from 1520–1521, under the Kalmar Union. Prior to becoming king, Duke Christian was sent to Norway in 1506 by John II (also called Hans), King of Norway (1483–1513) to take charge of the kingdom. In 1507, he became aware of a revolt in Hedmark. In early 1508, he took a force there, routing the rebellion. He then rowed across lake Mjøsa to Toten, capturing residents, imprisoning them in the vaulted cellar of the rectory in Østre Toten and torturing them there. As a result, he determined that Bishop Karl of Hamar had been behind the rebellion. With Bishop Karl as his captive, he was able to suppress the unrest.

Toten was a part of Akershus county until 1756, when it was became part of Oppland county. Lauritz Weidemann, Corporal Peder Balke, and Nels Dyhren from Toten attended the 1814 constitutional convention at Eidsvold.

Government
All municipalities in Norway, including Vestre Toten, are responsible for primary education (through 10th grade), outpatient health services, senior citizen services, welfare and other social services, zoning, economic development, and municipal roads and utilities. The municipality is governed by a municipal council of elected representatives, which in turn elect a mayor.

Municipal council
The municipal council  of Vestre Toten is made up of representatives that are elected to four year terms. X|The party breakdown of the municipal council is as follows:

Mayors
The mayors of Vestre Toten:

1838-1843: Peder Tollefsen Hallingstad
1844-1845: Johannes Johannessen Westrum
1846-1847: Hans Lemmich Juell
1848-1853: Wilhelm Christian Magelssen
1854-1855: Christian Eilert Heyerdahl
1856-1857: Johannes Johannessen Westrum
1858-1865: Christian Grønland
1866-1871: Lars Christiansen Blilie
1872-1885: Ole Christian Præstesæter
1886-1890: Peder Olsen Hohle
1890-1891: L. A. Grefsrud
1892-1893: Anton Jørgensen Røstøen
1894-1895: Ole Christian Præstesæter
1896-1901: Anton Jørgensen Røstøen
1902-1907: Mathias Blilie (LL)
1908-1916: Olav Larsson Gjørvad (AD)
1917-1922: Peder Markus Hansen Nauf (AD)
1923-1940: Severin Olsen (Ap)
1940-1942: Hans Henrik Petersen (NS) 
1942-1945: Ole Thorsrud (NS)
1945-1945: Severin Olsen (Ap)
1946-1951: Helge Sunde (Ap)
1952-1955: Hans J. Kjelsberg (Ap)
1956-1979: Sigurd Østlien (Ap)
1980-1995: Svein Erik Strandlie (Ap)
1995-2011: Stein Knutsen (Ap)
2011-2019: Leif Waarum (Ap)
2019–present: Stian Olafsen (Ap)

Geography

Vestre Toten is located along the large lake Mjøsa. The municipality is bordered by Østre Toten Municipality to the east, Gjøvik Municipality to the north,  Søndre Land Municipality to the west, and Gran Municipality to the southwest.

The Hunnselva river runs through the lake Einavatnet and flows through the whole municipality before going into Gjøvik where it empties into the large lake Mjøsa.

Economy
Farming and industry are important. Raufoss Aluminum is a major employer in the community. The Gjøvikbanen railway line passes through the community.

Notable people 

 Frøis Frøisland (1883 in Raufoss – 1930) a Norwegian newspaper correspondent and editor
 Karsten Gaarder (1902 in Vestre Toten – 1980) Justice of the Supreme Court of Norway
 Halfdan Hegtun (1918–2012) a radio personality, comedian, writer and former politician
 Aud Blegen Svindland (1928 in Vestre Toten – 2019) physician and women's rights activist
 Ronni Le Tekrø (born 1963) a guitarist with hard rock band TNT, lives in Raufoss
 Bente Nordby (born 1974 in Raufoss) a former Norwegian football goalkeeper with 172 caps for Norway women

References

External links

Municipal fact sheet from Statistics Norway 

 
Municipalities of Innlandet
1838 establishments in Norway